The players draft for the 2022 Kashmir Premier League took place on 21 July 2022. The players were divided into 7 categories: Icon, Platinum, Diamond, Gold, Silver, Emerging and Kashmiri. Each team chose 2 platinum players, 2 diamond players, 2 gold players, 4 silver players, 2 emerging players and 5 Kashmiri players. The 2022 KPL did not feature foreign players.

Key

Background 
The franchises all announced their icon players prior to the draft. Kamran Akmal was announced as Bagh Stallions’ icon player. Sharjeel Khan was announced as Jammu Janbaz’s icon player. Former Pakistani captain, Sarfaraz Ahmed, was announced as Kotli Lions’ captain. Mirpur Royals retained Shoaib Malik as their icon player. Muzaffarabad Tigers also retained Mohammad Hafeez as their icon player. Overseas Warriors selected Asad Shafiq as their icon player. Rawalakot Hawks announced that Mohammad Amir would be their icon player. The PCB was giving permission to draft foreign players who retired at least 5 years ago but the franchises were not interested in drafting them. The KPL president, Arif Malik, confirmed that the centrally contracted players chosen for the Netherlands tour would not participate in the KPL but they were requesting if the remaining contracted players could play. The PCB later allowed Fawad Alam, Azhar Ali, Abid Ali, Nauman Ali, Haseebullah, Mohammad Huraira and Ali Usman to participate in the tournament. Later, Sarfaraz Ahmed was also granted permission to play in the KPL. Khurram Manzoor was announced as Kotli Lions’ icon player.

Base squads 
Each franchise released a “Base Squad” prior to the draft. These were the 4-5 players that each franchise was retaining. Muzaffarabad Tigers and Bagh Stallions traded Sohaib Maqsood for Iftikhar Ahmed in their base squads.

Picks 
Every team had a “Wild Card” which allowed them to move a player’s category up by one or two categories. Each team also had a “Right to Match” card which allowed them to change a player’s category to the one they are picked in instead of the one they were listed in.

Supplementary draft
A supplementary draft was also held. Each team was allowed to select two supplementary players. The following are the picks:

Draft summary

Post-draft signings

Replacements

References

Kashmir Premier League (Pakistan)